The Maclaughlin River, a perennial river of the Snowy River catchment, is located in the Monaro region of New South Wales, Australia.

Course and features
The river descends  over its  course, flowing through Merriangaah Nature Reserve.

In its upper reaches, the Maclaughlin River is crossed by the Monaro Highway near Nimmitabel.

See also

 Rivers of New South Wales
 List of rivers of New South Wales (L-Z)
 List of rivers of Australia

References

Rivers of New South Wales